Jy Simpkin (born 5 March 1998) is a professional Australian rules footballer playing for the North Melbourne Football Club in the Australian Football League (AFL). He was drafted by the North Melbourne Football Club with their first selection and twelfth overall in the 2016 national draft. He made his debut in the 43-point loss against  in the opening round of the 2017 season at Etihad Stadium.

Born in Mooroopna, Victoria, Simpkin is of Aboriginal and European descent. He completed his high-school education at Scotch College, Melbourne, as part of an AIEF scholarship program.

Statistics
Statistics are correct as of the end of 2020

|- style="background:#EAEAEA"
| scope="row" text-align:center | 2017
| 
| 21 || 13 || 9 || 5 || 72 || 69 || 141 || 35 || 31 || 0.7 || 0.4 || 5.5 || 5.3 || 10.8 || 2.7 || 2.4 
|-
| scope="row" text-align:center | 2018
| 
| 12 || 22 || 12 || 7 || 144 || 183 || 327 || 51 || 80 || 0.5 || 0.3 || 6.5 || 8.3 || 14.9 || 2.3 || 3.6 
|- style="background:#EAEAEA"
| scope="row" text-align:center | 2019
| 
| 12 || 21 || 6 || 8 || 200 || 190 || 390 || 49 || 75 || 0.3 || 0.4 || 9.5 || 9.0 || 18.6 || 2.3 || 3.6 
|-
| 2020 ||  || 12
| 17 || 6 || 5 || 173 || 173 || 344 || 37 || 63 || 0.35 || 0.29 || 10.1 || 10.1 || 20.2 || 2.17 || 3.7
|- style="background:#EAEAEA; font-weight:bold; width:2em"
| scope="row" text-align:center class="sortbottom" colspan=3 | Career
| 73
| 33
| 25
| 587
| 615
| 1202
| 172
| 249
| 0.46
| 0.34
| 9.02
| 8.17
| 16.1
| 2.36
| 3.32
|}

Notes

References

External links

1998 births
Living people
North Melbourne Football Club players
Murray Bushrangers players
Australian rules footballers from Victoria (Australia)
Indigenous Australian players of Australian rules football
People educated at Scotch College, Melbourne
People from Mooroopna